Dominique Perrault (born 9 April 1953 in Clermont-Ferrand) is a French architect and urban planner. He became world known for the design of the French National Library, distinguished with the Silver medal for town planning in 1992 and the Mies van der Rohe Prize in 1996. In 2010 he was awarded the gold medal by the French Academy of Architecture for all his work. He was named as the 2015 Praemium Imperiale Laureate for Architecture.

He received his Diploma in Architecture at the Ecole Nationale Supérieure des Beaux-Arts in Paris in 1978. He also holds a postgraduate diplomas in Town Planning from the Ecole supérieure des Ponts et Chaussée and History from the Ecole des Hautes Etudes en Sciences Sociales.

He currently heads Dominique Perrault Architecture (DPA) in Paris.

Biography
Leading figure of French architecture, Dominique Perrault is Professor at the Ecole Polytechnique Fédérale de Lausanne, a lecturer in France and abroad and a member of the Conseil scientifique de l’Atelier International du Grand Paris since 2012. After winning the competition of the Bibliothèque Nationale de France in 1989, he realized, amongst other projects, the Olympic Velodrome and Olympic swimming pool in Berlin, the fourth and fifth extension of the seat of the Court of Justice of the European Union in Luxembourg, the Olympic Tennis Stadium in Madrid, the Ewha Womans University or the Fukoku Tower in Osaka. His work is exhibited in major museums around the world. A solo exhibition showing all of his work was held at the Centre Georges Pompidou in Paris in 2008. He was also appointed Commissioner of the French pavilion architecture section of the Venice Biennale in 2010.
Dominique Perrault leads in parallel significant heritage rehabilitation projects including those of Longchamp Racecourse in Paris, Dufour Pavilion at Versailles and La Poste du Louvre in Paris. In spring 2014, Dominique Perrault inaugurated the tallest tower of Austria in Vienna, the DC Tower 1, icon of the new business district and the Grand Théâtre des Cordeliers  in the historical city of Albi, south of France.

Approach
Four specific conceptual features were highlighted by the University of Architecture and Urbanism in Bucharest in May 2013 who granted Dominique Perrault the title of "Doctor Honoris Causa". "The first feature, which is tightly connected to an imperative need of enriching the architectural language, regards the eloquent interpretation of some sources coming from artistic minimalism and conceptual art. With Dominique Perrault, the architectural design vocabulary is heading towards a reduction of syntax, not of morphology. The second concerns his open, flexible approach that accepts uncertainties and rejects dogmatism and the critique of the privileged role of style and composition in the modern architectural discourse. The third feature highlights the idea of how architecture should be understood as a part of landscape within the topography of fundamental relations. The fourth emphasizes his experience with space and materiality. Being inspired by the lesson of modernism, the curtain façades, detached from structure and enhanced by light, transparent or translucent screens of glass or metal seem to be a tribute to contemporary technologies, yet are not subservient to them. Innovation often penetrates the engineering level."
According to Frederic Migayrou, "All of Dominique Perrault’s work questions the figural aspect of architecture, its ability to provide meaning, to build a dynamic image woven out of social and cultural values. […] Dominique Perrault weaves his position between rationalism that seeks to articulate laws for the composition of typological elements, and a structuralist understanding of architectural syntax, thereby increasing the possibilities of interplay between very disparate scales of symbolic values." At the crossroads of disciplines, Luis Fernandez-Galiano reminds that "it is frequent to describe Perrault’s work in terms of the great tradition of French geometric monumentality; it is inevitable to relate his bold gestures in this area with that affirmative urbanism which treats nature as voluntary geography; and it is necessary to interpret the almost innocent simplicity of his fundamental drawings in the light of the conceptual or minimal practices which extend up to the limits of ‘land art’ and ‘arte povera’.

Built projects 

 1981-1983 : Someloir factory, Châteaudun, France)
 1983-1986 : Housing estate «Les Caps Horniers», Rezé-lès-Nantes, France
 1984-1987: ESIEE – Academy for engineers of electronics and electrical engineering, Marne-la-Vallée, France
 1986-1990: Multi-storey industrial building « Hôtel Industriel Jean-Baptiste Berlier », Paris, France
 1987-1993: Water processing plant for SAGEP, Ivry-sur-Seine, France 
 1988-1991: Conference center Usinor-Sacilor, Saint-Germain-en-Laye, France
 1988-1991: Apartment building «Le Louis Lumière», Saint-Quentin-en-Yvelines, France
 1988-1994: Meuse Department Headquarters, Bar-le-Duc, France
 1989-1993: Mayenne Departmental Archives, Laval, France
 1989-1995: French National Library, Paris, France
 1991 : Galerie Denise René, Paris, France
 1992-1999: Olympic Velodrome and Olympic swimming pool, Berlin, Germany
 1993-1995: Technical center of books, Bussy Saint-Georges, France
 1995-1997: The Great Greenhouse for the Cité des Sciences et de l’Industrie, Paris, France
 1996-2004: Innsbruck Town Hall, Austria
 1996-2019: Fourth and fifth extensions of the EU's Palais de la Cour de Justice, Luxembourg
 1997-1999: APLIX factory- Industrial manufacturing unit, Le Cellier, Nantes, France 
 1997-2001: Lucie Aubrac Multimedia Library, Vénissieux, France
 1998-2007: Montigalà sport complex, Badalona, Barcelona, Spain 
 1999-2003: Three supermarkets for MPREIS group, Wattens, Zirl, Austria
 1999-2004: Piazza Gramsci, Cinisello Balsamo, Milan, Italy
 1999-2008: ME Barcelona Hotel, Barcelona, Spain
 1999-2009: Hines office building, Barcelona, Spain
 2000-2002: Parking garage Emile Durkheim, Paris, France
 2001-2004: GKD-USA Factory, Cambridge, Maryland, USA
 2002-2005: Café Lichtblick, terrace of town hall, Innsbruck, Austria
 2002-2009: Olympic Tennis Stadium, Manzanares Park, Madrid, Spain 
 2004: Design of Friedrich-Ebert-Platz, Düren, Germany
 2004-2006: Nô Theater, Niigata, Japan 
 2004-2007: Factory Rehabilitation for Dominique Perrault Architecture, Paris, France
 2004-2008: Ewha Womans University, Seoul, South Korea
 2004-2014: DC Towers 1, Donau City, Vienna, Austria
 2005-2009: Office building, Boulogne Billancourt, France
 2005-2008: Priory Park pavilion, Reigate, United Kingdom
 2005-2009: Metropolitan Hotel, Perpignan, France
 2005-2012: Housing, offices and shops, Zac Euralille 2, Lille, France
 2006-2009: Office building, Onix, Lille, France
 2006-2009: NH- Fiera Milano 4 star Hotel, Milan, Italy
 2006-2010: Fukoku Tower, Osaka, Japan
 2006-2012: Rouen Sports Palace, France
 2007-2010: Krisztina Palace Facades, Budapest, Hungary
 2007-2011: Housing and offices «La Liberté», Groningen, Netherlands
 2007-2014: B&B hotel, Paris, France
 2008-2011: Arganzuela footbridge, Madrid, Spain
 2009: Sammode office building, Paris, France
 2009-2011: Residential complex, Jeju Island, South Korea
 2009-2014: Albi Grand Theater, France
 2011 : Installation «Open Box» for the Gwangju Biennale, South Korea
 2011-2013: BnF MK2 – Commercial development of the French National Library, site François Mitterrand, Paris, France
 2011-2013: Ecole Polytechnique Fédérale de Lausanne. Rehabilitation / extension of the former Library (BI), Lausanne, Switzerland

Main current projects
 2013-2023: Villejuif IGR Station / Grand Paris Express, France
 2013-2018: Construction of mixed-use buildings, Zürich, Switzerland
 2012-2018: Repurposing of La Poste du Louvre building, Paris, France
 2009-2018: Urban redevelopment of the main station area, Locarno, Switzerland
 2005-2018: Construction of the Convention Centre and Exhibition Hall, Leon, Spain
 2011-2017: Refurbishment of the Longchamp Racecourse, Paris, France
 2011-2016: Rehabilitation and extension of the M&E hall, Ecole Polytechnique Fédérale de Lausanne, Lausanne, Switzerland
 2004-2016: Piazza Garibaldi, Naples, Italy
 2004-2016: Vienna DC Towers, Vienna, Austria
 2012-2015: Esplanade Tower, Fribourg, Switzerland
 2011-2015: Repurposing of the Pavillon Dufour, Château de Versailles, France
 2007-2015: Refurbishment of the Pont de Sèvres towers, Boulogne-Billancourt, France

Cancelled project
 The New Mariinsky Theatre, St Petersburg, Russia - the project won the competition in 2003 but was cancelled in 2007 because of disagreement on the construction process between Perrault and Russian bureaucrats.

References

External links

 Official site 
 Interview with the Russian architecture Journal Speech (in English and Russian)

1953 births
Living people
Architects from Clermont-Ferrand
20th-century French architects
21st-century French architects
Postmodern architects
Modernist architecture in France
Theatre architects
Members of the European Academy of Sciences and Arts
Academic staff of the École Polytechnique Fédérale de Lausanne
Commandeurs of the Ordre des Arts et des Lettres
Officiers of the Légion d'honneur
Recipients of the Praemium Imperiale